The 1965 British Open Championship was held at the Lansdowne Club in London from 9–16 December 1964. Abdelfattah Abou Taleb won his second consecutive title defeating Ibrahim Amin in the final. Roshan Khan seeded five pulled out of the main draw.

Seeds

Draw and results

Section 1

Section 2

Third Place
 Abdelfattah Abou Taleb beat  Ibrahim Amin 9-0 0-9 9-1 9-6

Final
 Tewfik Shafik beat  Aftab Jawaid 9-3 2-9 9-5 3-9 10-8

References

Men's British Open Squash Championships
Men's British Open Championship
Men's British Open Squash Championship
Men's British Open Squash Championship
Men's British Open Squash Championship
Squash competitions in London